The 16733/16734 Rameswaram–Okha Express is an Express train belonging to Indian Railways – Madurai Division of the Southern Railway zone that runs between  and  in India. 

It operates as train number 16733 from Rameswaram to Okha and as train number 16734 in the reverse direction, serving the states of Tamil Nadu, Andhra Pradesh, Telangana, Maharashtra and Gujarat.

History
It is one of the very first train which is operated from Rameswaram immediately after Gauge Conversion of Manamadurai–Rameswaram line from Meter Gauge to Broad Gauge. This train is operated in such a long circuitous route because during its introduction, most of the railway lines in India are under gauge conversion from narrower gauges to broad gauge, so this train is operated using existing railway routes at that time. This train was originally introduced between Madurai and Manamad. Later this train was extended in both sides i.e. From Madurai it was extended until Rameswaram and from Manamad it was extended until Okha. At initial days of operation, its maintenance is done at Madurai, after constructing a railway maintenance yard at Rameswaram, the maintenance of this train has been shifted from Madurai to Rameswaram. At present, It is the only train from southern part of Tamil Nadu such as Madurai, Rameswaram which are directly connected with the Manamad, Aurangabad areas of Maharashtra.

Coaches

The train has standard ICF rakes with max speed of 110 kmph. The train consists of 22 coaches:

 2 AC II Tier
 2 AC III Tier
 11 Sleeper coaches
 4 General Unreserved
 2 Seating cum Luggage Rake
 1 Pantry car

As is customary with most train services in India, coach composition may be amended at the discretion of Indian Railways depending on demand.

Service

Route

At present it is the only direct express train which runs from rameswaram to nearby places of mumbai such as manmad, surat.

Schedule

Traction

After Madurai Junction, both trains are hauled by a Diesel Loco Shed, Erode-based WDP-4D up to Okha and vice versa.

References

External links
16733 Rameswaram - Okha Express at India Rail Info
16734 Okha - Rameswaram Express at India Rail Info

Express trains in India
Rail transport in Tamil Nadu
Rail transport in Andhra Pradesh
Rail transport in Telangana
Rail transport in Maharashtra
Rail transport in Gujarat
Transport in Rameswaram
Transport in Okha
Railway services introduced in 2006